The Gran Sasso Tunnel is part of the A24 Motorway that links Rome and the Adriatic Sea via L'Aquila and Teramo, through the Apennine Mountains via the Gran Sasso in Abruzzo.

There are two tunnels, each with two lanes for each direction, 10,176 metres long, that also host the Laboratori Nazionali del Gran Sasso. Construction started on November 14, 1968. The eastbound tunnel (to Teramo) opened on December 1, 1984 while the westbound tunnel (to L'Aquila) opened in 1995.

It is the third longest road tunnel in Italy, after the Fréjus and Monte Bianco tunnels, and the longest road tunnel entirely on Italian territory. It is the longest tunnel in Europe with two tubes of two lanes.

The highway over the mountain, which now sees little traffic, has been renamed the Grand Highway of the Gran Sasso and Monti della Laga National Park to highlight its status as a scenic route.

Road tunnels in Italy
Tunnels completed in 1984